This is a list of alumni of Royal College Colombo in Sri Lanka, often called "Old Royalists".

Heads of State

Heads of Government

Royalty

Viceregal

Prominent figures in the Independence Movement

National politics

Heads of Legislature

Ministers and legislators

Current 
Government benches 

Opposition benches

Former
Pre-Independence
 Sir James Peiris  – Vice President of the Legislative Council and first Ceylonese Acting Governor (note: also listed in Prominent figures in the Independence Movement)
 Sir Richard Morgan – first Ceylonese member of the Governor's Executive Council and Member of the Legislative Council (note: also listed in Judges)
 Sir Ponnambalam Arunachalam CCS – member of the Executive Council and Legislative Council (note: also listed in Prominent figures in the Independence Movement)
 Sir Ponnambalam Ramanathan  – first elected Ceylonese representative unofficial member of the Legislative Council (note: also listed in Prominent figures in the Independence Movement and Civil Servants)
 Sir Hector van Cuylenburg –  first elected Burgher representative unofficial member of the Legislative Council
 Sir Marcus Fernando  – member of the Executive Council and Legislative Council (note: also listed in Medicine)
 Sir Arunachalam Mahadeva  – former Minister Home Affaires of the State Council and member of the Legislative Council (note: also listed in Diplomats)
 Sir Bandara Panabokke Adigar – First Minister of Health in the State Council and a member of the Legislative Council (note: also listed in Diplomats)
 Sir Forester Obeysekera – Speaker of the State Council and a member of the Legislative Council (note: also listed in Heads of legislature)
 Sir Susantha de Fonseka  – Deputy Speaker of the State Council (note: also listed in Diplomats)
 Sir Harry Dias Bandaranaike – former Member of the Legislative Council, acting Chief Justice of the Supreme Court of Ceylon and first Ceylonese Barrister (note: also listed in Judges)
 Sir Muthu Coomaraswamy – former Member of the Legislative Council
 Sir Henry de Mel  – former Member of the Legislative Council (note: also listed in Industrialists)
 Colonel T. G. Jayewardene  CLI – former Member of the State Council (note: also listed in Military)
 E. W. Perera – former Member of the State Council and the Legislative Council (note: also listed in Prominent figures in the Independence Movement)
 Donald Obeyesekere – former Member of the State Council and the Legislative Council (note: also listed in Sportsmen and sports administrators)
 Justice Sir Thomas Garvin  – former ex-officio Member of the Legislative Council (note: also listed in Judges and lawyers)
 Justice Maas Thajoon Akbar  – former ex-officio Member of the Legislative Council (note: also listed in Judges and lawyers)
 C. E. Corea – former Member of the Legislative Council, President of the Ceylon National Congress (1924) (note: also listed in Prominent figures in the Independence Movement)
 Charles Ambrose Lorensz – former Member of the Legislative Council (note: also listed in Judges)
 T M Sabaratnam – former Member of the Legislative Council
 James De Alwis – former Member of the Legislative Council (note: also listed in Poets)
 K. Balasingam – former Member of the Executive Council and Legislative Council
 J. R. Weinman – former Member of the Legislative Council (note: also listed in Judges)
 A. J. R. de Soysa – former Member of the Legislative Council of Ceylon
 C. H. Z. Fernando – former Member of the Legislative Council
 W. M. Rajapakse – former Member of the Legislative Council 
 S. W. Dassenaike - former Member of the State Council

Post-Independence
 E. B. Wikramanayake  – former Senator and Cabinet Minister of Justice
 A. P. Jayasuriya – former Senator, Cabinet Minister of Health and Member of Parliament
 Sarath Wijesinghe – former Senator, Cabinet Minister of Nationalized Services and Senator
 Justin Kotelawala – former Senator and Member of the State Council
 Sir Razik Fareed  JP – former Cabinet Minister of Trade, Deputy Speaker, Member of Parliament, the Senate and the State Council (note: also listed in Diplomats)
 Somasundaram Nadesan  – former Senator (note: also listed in Lawyers)
 V.R. Schockman – former Senator (note: also listed in Mayors, Sportsmen and sports administrators)
 R.S.V. Poulier  CCS – former Senator and Member of Parliament
 L. L. Hunter  - former Parliamentary Secretary, Senator and Member of Parliament
 C. Coomaraswamy CCS – former Senator (note: also listed in Civil servants, Diplomats)
 Lalith Athulathmudali PC – former Cabinet Minister of National Security & Defence, Minister of Agriculture, Minister of Education, Member of Parliament
 Anura Bandaranaike – former Cabinet Minister of Foreign Affairs, Tourism, Industry, Investment & National Heritage, Leader of the Opposition, Member of Parliament (note: also listed in Heads of legislature)
 Major E. A. Nugawela CLI – former Cabinet Minister of Education (of the first cabinet 1947), Member of Parliament & State Council
 Cathiravelu Sittampalam CCS – former Cabinet Minister of Posts and Telecommunications (of the first cabinet 1947), Member of Parliament
 Abeyratne Ratnayaka – former Cabinet Minister of Food and Cooperatives (of the first cabinet 1947), Member of Parliament & State Council
 Felix R. Dias Bandaranaike – former Cabinet Minister of Finance, Public Administration, Local Government, Home Affairs, Justice, Member of Parliament
 Deshamanya Nissanka Wijeyeratne CCS – former Cabinet Minister of Education, Higher Education & Justice, Member of Parliament (note: also listed in Civil servants)
 Colvin R de Silva – former Cabinet Minister of Plantation Industries and Constitutional Affairs, Member of Parliament
 Tyronne Fernando PC – former Cabinet Minister of Foreign Affairs, Member of Parliament (note: also listed in Viceregal, Diplomats)
 Anil Moonesinghe – former Cabinet Minister of Communications, Deputy Speaker, Member of Parliament (note: also listed in Diplomats)
 Pieter Keuneman – former Cabinet Minister of Housing and Local Government, Member of Parliament
 Cyril Mathew – former Cabinet Minister of Industries and Scientific Affairs, Member of Parliament
 Stanly de Zoysa – former Cabinet Minister of Finance, Member of Parliament
 medical doctor Ranjit Atapattu – former Cabinet Minister of Health, Member of Parliament
 C.V. Gunaratne – former Cabinet Minister Industrial of Development, Member of Parliament
 R.G. Senanayake – former Cabinet Minister of Trade, Member of Parliament holding two concurrent seats from two continuances
 P.B. Bulankulama Dissawa – former Minister of Lands, Member of Parliament
 Milinda Moragoda – former Cabinet Minister of Justice and Law Reforms, Member of Parliament
 Deshamanya J.P. Obeyesekere III – former Acting Cabinet Minister of Health, Finance, and Member of Parliament (note: also listed in Aviation)
 Gamini Jayasuriya – former Cabinet Minister of Health, Agriculture Development; Member of Parliament
 Indika Gunawardena – former Cabinet Minister of Fisheries, Member of Parliament
 George Rajapakse – former Cabinet Minister of Fisheries, Member of Parliament
 P. B. Bulankulame Dissava – former Cabinet Minister of Land, Land Development and Member of Parliament
 Mano Wijeyeratne – former Minister of Plantation Services, Non-Cabinet Minister of Enterprise Development, Member of Parliament
 Susil Moonesinghe – former Chief Minister of the Western Provincial Council, Member of Parliament (note: also listed in Local government and Diplomats)
 T. B. Panabokke – former Deputy Minister of Justice & Agriculture and Member of Parliament (note: also listed in Diplomats)
 Wijaya Dahanayake – former Deputy Minister of Public Administration and Home Affairs and Member of Parliament
 Mangala Moonesinghe – former Member of Parliament (note: also listed in Diplomats)
 H. Sri Nissanka  – former Member of Parliament and one of the founders of the SLFP (note: also listed in Lawyers)
 Walwin de Silva CCS – former Member of Parliament (note: also listed in Civil servants)
 Arumugam Thondaman – former Cabinet Minister and Member of Parliament
 Malik Samarawickrama – former Cabinet Minister and Member of Parliament
 Mangala Samaraweera – former Cabinet Minister and Member of Parliament
 Ravi Karunanayake – former Cabinet Minister and Member of Parliament
 Sagala Ratnayaka – former Cabinet Minister and Member of Parliament
 D. M. Swaminathan – former Cabinet Minister and Member of Parliament
 Faiszer Musthapha – former Cabinet Minister and Member of Parliament
 Mohan Lal Grero – former State Minister and Member of Parliament
 Neelan Thiruchelvam – former Member of Parliament
 Wilmot A. Perera – former Member of Parliament (note: also listed in Diplomats)
 Ahmed Hussain Macan Markar – former Member of Parliament
 Arthur de Zoysa – former Member of Parliament
 J. A. Martenze – former Member of Parliament (note: also listed in Industrialists and corporate executives)
 Tissa Kapukotuwa – former Member of Parliament
 Murugesu Balasunderam – former Member of Parliament
 Gladwin Kotelawala  – former Member of Parliament
 Sajin Vass Gunawardena – former Member of Parliament
 Mohamed Latheef – former Member of the Maldivian Parliament

Judiciary
Chief Justices
 Miliani Sansoni – former Chief Justice of the Supreme Court of Ceylon
 Hugh Norman Gregory Fernando – former Chief Justice of the Supreme Court of Ceylon
 Parinda Ranasinghe – former Chief Justice of the Supreme Court of Sri Lanka
 Mohan Peiris PC – former Chief Justice of the Supreme Court of Sri Lanka (note: also listed in Lawyers)

Acting Chief Justices
 Sir Richard Morgan – former Acting Chief Justice of the Supreme Court of Ceylon (note: also listed in Legislators)
 Sir Harry Dias Bandaranaike – former Acting Chief Justice of the Supreme Court of Ceylon and first Ceylonese Barrister (note: also listed in Legislators)
 Sir Thomas Garvin  – former Acting Chief Justice and Puisne Justice of the Supreme Court of Ceylon (note: also listed in Legislators and Lawyers)
 C. Nagalingam  – former Acting Chief Justice and Puisne Justice of the Supreme Court of Ceylon (note: also listed in Viceregal)
 Eugene Reginald de Fonseka  – former Acting Chief Justice and Puisne Justice of the Supreme Court of Ceylon
 S. W. B. Wadugodapitiya PC – former Acting Chief Justice and Puisne Justice of the Supreme Court of Sri Lanka

Puisne Justice of the Supreme Court
 Lucien Macull Dominic de Silva  – former Puisne Justice of the Supreme Court of Ceylon and member of the Judicial Committee of the Privy Council 
 Sir Thomas De Sampayo  – former Puisne Justice of the Supreme Court of Ceylon
 Sri Lankabhimanya Christopher Weeramantry AM – former Vice President and Judge of the International Court of Justice, Puisne Justice of the Supreme Court of Sri Lanka
 Eugene Wilfred Jayewardene  – former Puisne Justice of the Supreme Court of Ceylon
 John Adrian St. Valentine Jayewardene – former Puisne Justice of the Supreme Court of Ceylon
 Maas Thajoon Akbar  – former Puisne Justice of the Supreme Court of Ceylon (note: also listed in Legislators and lawyers)
 Saleem Marsoof PC – Puisne Justice of the Supreme Court of Sri Lanka and Justice of Appeal of the Supreme Court of Fiji
 Oswald Leslie De Kretser II  – former Puisne Justice of the Supreme Court of Ceylon
 Oswald Leslie De Kretser III – former Puisne Justice of the Supreme Court of Ceylon
 Felix Reginald Dias Bandaranaike I – former Puisne Justice of the Supreme Court of Ceylon
 Felix Reginald Dias Bandaranaike II – former Puisne Justice of the Supreme Court of Ceylon
 Arthur Eric Keuneman  – former Puisne Justice of the Supreme Court of Ceylon
 V. M. Fernando – former Puisne Justice of the Supreme Court of Ceylon
 T. S. Fernando  – former Puisne Justice of the Supreme Court of Ceylon (note: also listed in Lawyers)
 F. H. B. Koch  – former Puisne Justice of the Supreme Court of Ceylon
 V. Manicavasagar – former Puisne Justice of the Supreme Court of Ceylon, Chancellor of the University of Jaffna
 C. V. Vigneswaran PC – former Justice of the Supreme Court of Sri Lanka (note: also listed in Provincial Councilors)
 Asoka Wijetunga – former Puisne Justice of the Supreme Court of Sri Lanka
 P. Edussuriya – former Puisne Justice of the Supreme Court of Sri Lanka
 Anil Goonaratne – former Puisne Justice of the Supreme Court of Sri Lanka
 K. T. Chitrasiri – former Puisne Justice of the Supreme Court of Sri Lanka
 Prasanna Jayawardena PC – current Puisne Justice of the Supreme Court of Sri Lanka

Judges of the Court of Appeal of Sri Lanka
 Siva Selliah – former Judge of the Court of Appeal of Sri Lanka
 Eric Basnayake – former Judge of the Court of Appeal of Sri Lanka and the Court of Appeal of Fiji
 Achala Wengappuli – current Judge of the Court of Appeal of Sri Lanka

Other judges
 Sarath Ambepitiya – former Judge of the High Court of Colombo
 J. R. Weinman – former District Judge of Colombo (note: also listed in Legislators)
 Charles Ambrose Lorensz – former District Judge, Acting Queen's Advocate (note: also listed in Legislators and journalists)
 Dhammika Kitulgoda – District Judge (note: also listed in Civil servants)

Provincial and local government

Governors

Chief Ministers and Provincial Councilors

Mayors

Municipal Councilors
 F. R. Senanayake – former Member of the Colombo Municipal Council (note: also listed in Prominent figures in the Independence Movement)

Diplomats
 Hamilton Shirley Amerasinghe CCS – former President of the United Nations General Assembly, Ceylon's Permanent Representative to the UN, New York and High Commissioner to India (note: also listed in Civil servants)
 Deshamanya Gamani Corea – Under-Secretary-General of the United Nations and Sri Lankan Ambassador to the EEC, Belgium, Luxembourg and the Netherlands (note: also listed in Civil servants)
 Deshamanya Vernon L. B. Mendis SLOS – former United Nations' Special Envoy to the Middle East, Sri Lankan High Commissioner to the United Kingdom, Canada; Ambassador to USSR, Cuba and Secretary General of the Non Aligned Movement
 Rodney Vandergert SLOS – former Permanent Secretary of the Ministry of Foreign Affairs, Sri Lankan Ambassador to China and USSR, Sri Lankan High Commissioner to Canada (note: also listed in Public commissions and Corporations)
 Wilhelm Woutersz SLOS – former Permanent Secretary of the Ministry of Foreign Affairs, Sri Lankan Ambassador to China, Italy and Yugoslavia
 Esala Weerakoon SLOS – former Permanent Secretary of the Ministry of Foreign Affairs, Sri Lankan High Commissioner to India and Ambassador to Norway 
 Lal Jayawardena – Second Vice-Chairman of the Group of 24, former Sri Lankan High Commissioner to the United Kingdom and Ambassador to the EEC, Belgium, Luxembourg and the Netherlands (note: also listed in Civil servants)
 John De Saram – former Director of the Office of the Legal Counsel, United Nations Office of Legal Affairs, Member of the International Law Commission and Permanent Representative of Sri Lanka to the UN, New York (note: also listed in Lawyers)
 Susantha De Alwis SLOS – former Sri Lankan Ambassador to the United States, Japan, South Korea and Ambassador/Permanent Representative of Ceylon to the UN, Geneva.
 Yogendra Duraiswamy SLOS – former Sri Lankan Ambassador to United States, China, Italy
 Neville Jansz CCS – former Ceylon's Ambassador to Australia (note: also listed in Civil servants)
 C. Coomaraswamy CCS – former Ceylon's High Commissioner to India (note: also listed in Legislators and Civil Servants)
 Sir Susantha de Fonseka  – former Ambassador to Japan and Burma (note: also listed in Legislators)
 Sir Razik Fareed OBE JP – High Commissioner to Pakistan (note: also listed in Legislators)
 Sir Arunachalam Mahadeva – former High Commissioner to India (note: also listed in Legislators)
 Sir Bandara Panabokke Adigar – former Representative of the Government of Ceylon in India (note: also listed in Legislators)
 General Deshamanya D. S. Attygalle  CLI – High Commissioner to the United Kingdom (note: also listed in Military)
 General T. I. Weerathunga VSV ndc SLLI – Sri Lankan High Commissioner to Canada (note: also listed in Military)
 General Jagath Jayasuriya VSV USP ndc psc SLAC – current Sri Lankan Ambassador to Brazil (note: also listed in Military)
 Admiral Thisara S.G. Samarasinghe RSP VSV USP ndc psc DISS MNI SLN – Sri Lankan High Commissioner designate to Australia (note: also listed in Military)
 Vice Admiral Asoka de Silva VSV ndc psc SLN – Sri Lankan Ambassador to Cuba (note: also listed in Military)
 Ana Seneviratne (IGP) – Sri Lankan High Commissioner to Malaysia (note: also listed in Police)
 T. B. Panabokke – former High Commissioner to India (note: also listed in Legislators)
 Tyronne Fernando PC – former Sri Lankan Ambassador to France (note: also listed in Legislators)
 Wilmot A. Perera – first Ceylonese Ambassador to China
 Anil Moonesinghe – Sri Lankan Ambassador to Austria and Ambassador/Permanent Representative the UN, Geneva (note: also listed in Legislators)
 Mangala Moonesinghe – former High Commissioner to the United Kingdom (note: also listed in Legislators)
 Susil Moonesinghe – former Ambassador to Iran (note: also listed in Legislators)
 Wickrema Weerasooria – former High Commissioner to Australia and New Zealand (note: also listed in Civil servants)
 Ernest Corea – Sri Lanka's former Ambassador to the United States, High Commissioner to Canada (note: also listed in Media personalities and Journalists)
 Daya Perera PC – Sri Lankan High Commissioner to Canada and former Ambassador to the United Nations
 Deshamanya Neville Kanakeratne – Sri Lankan Ambassador to the United States and High Commissioner to India (note: also listed in Viceregal)
 Oliver Weerasinghe  – Sri Lanka's former Ambassador to the United States (note: also listed in Architects)
 Tissa Wijeyeratne – Sri Lankan Ambassador to France, Switzerland and UNESCO, Senior Advisor (Foreign Affairs) to the Prime Minister, Additional Secretary to Ministry of External Affairs and Defence
 Omer Kamil – former Sri Lankan Ambassador to Iran (note: also listed in Mayors)
 T. D. S. A. Dissanayake – former Sri Lankan Ambassador to Indonesia and Egypt; prominent Sri Lankan diplomat in the UN
 S. J. Walpita CCS – former Ceylon's Ambassador to the Federal Republic of Germany, the Netherlands and Belgium (note: also listed in Civil servants)
 Vipula Wanigasekera  – former Sri Lanka's first Consul General to Norway, Director General, Sri Lanka Tourism Authority, Ministry of Tourism (note: also listed in Civil servants)

Civil servants
 Hamilton Shirley Amerasinghe CCS – former Permanent Secretary of the Ministry of Finance & Treasury, Ministry of Health (note: also listed in Diplomats)
 Deshamanya C.A. Coorey SLAS – former Permanent Secretary of the Ministry of Finance & Treasury
 Deshamanya Baku Mahadeva CCS – former Permanent Secretary of the Treasury, the Ministry of Agriculture and Food and the Ministry of Public Administration and Home Affairs
 Lal Jayawardena – former Permanent Secretary of the Ministry of Finance & Treasury; founding Director of the World Institute for Development Economics Research (note: also listed in Diplomats)
 Lalith Weeratunga SLAS – current Permanent Secretary to the President
 Deshamanya Gamani Corea – former Secretary-General of the UNCTD (1974–1984), Permanent Secretary of the Ministry of Planning and Economic Affairs, Senior Deputy Governor of the Central Bank of Ceylon (note: also listed in Diplomats)
 Nissanka Wijeyeratne CCS – former Permanent Secretary of the Ministries of Information & Broadcasting, Transport and Cultural Affairs (note: also listed in Legislators)
 A. S. Jayawardene – former Permanent Secretary of the Ministry of Finance & Treasury, Governor of the Central Bank of Sri Lanka and former Alternate Executive Director of the International Monetary Fund (IMF), Washington D.C
 Bernard Peiris  JP – former Cabinet Secretary
 H. C. Goonewardene CCS – former Permanent Secretary to the Ministry of Home Affairs
 S. J. Walpita CCS – former Permanent Secretary to the Ministry of Industries & Fisheries and Vice-Chancellor of University of Ceylon, Peradeniya (note: also listed in Diplomats)
 Walwin de Silva CCS – former Vice Chancellor of University of Ceylon, Colombo and Director of Education (note: also listed in Legislators)
 Charitha Ratwatte – former Permanent Secretary of the Ministry of Finance & Treasury, Ministry of Youth Affairs
 Wickrema Weerasooria – former Permanent Secretary to the Ministry of Plan Implementation and current Insurance Ombudsman (note: also listed in Diplomats)
 Sunil Mendis – former Governor of the Central Bank of Sri Lanka
 Arjuna Mahendran – former Governor of the Central Bank of Sri Lanka and former Chairman of Board of Investment of Sri Lanka (note: also listed in Corporate Executives)
 Indrajit Coomaraswamy – current Governor of the Central Bank of Sri Lanka and former Director Economic Affairs, Commonwealth Secretariat
 Nihal Seneviratne – former Secretary General of Parliament (1981–1994) and parliamentary affairs adviser to the Prime Minister
 Dhammika Kitulgoda – Secretary General of Parliament (1999–2002, 2008–2012), Secretary to the Parliamentary Council and former District Judge (note: also listed in Judges)
 Dhammika Dasanayake – current Secretary General of Parliament
 Vernon Abeysekera CCS – former Postmaster General and Director of Radio Ceylon.
 Neville Jansz CCS – Director General of the Department of Foreign Affairs, Ministry of External Affairs and Defence (note: also listed in Diplomats)
 C. Coomaraswamy CCS – former Registrar General and Government Agent (note: also listed in Legislators, Diplomats)
 Victor Gunasekara CCS – former Controller of Imports Exports and Government Agent of Kegalle
 Aubrey Neil Weinman  – First Superintendent (Director) of the Colombo Zoological Gardens
 Captain Cyril Nicholas  KRR – first Warden of the Wild Life Department (note: also listed in Military)
 R.G. Anthonisz  JP – first Government Archivist
 Gamini Iriyagolla SLAS – former Presidential adviser 
 Donald Rutnam – Deputy Commissioner of the Central Provinces and Berar and member of the Indian Civil Service (note: also listed in Sportsmen)

Military

Army

Navy

Air Force

Ceylon Defence Force

British Army

Police

Academics

 Vidya Jyothi V. K. Samaranayake – former Dean of the Faculty of Science, University of Colombo, Professor of Computer Science and Founder of University of Colombo School of Computing
 Vidya Jyothi Osmund Jayaratne – former President of the Colombo Campus, University of Sri Lanka (now University of Colombo), Emeritus Professor of Physics and left wing politician
 Chandre Dharma-wardana – former President of the Vidyodaya Campus, University of Ceylon, (now University of Sri Jayewardenepura) currently Professor of Theoretical Physics at the Université de Montréal
 K. Kailasapathy – first president of the Jaffna Campus, University of Sri Lanka
 V. Sivalingam – Founder of Faculty of Medicine, University of Peradeniya and first Professor of Parasitology in the University of Ceylon
 S.R. Kottegoda – former Dean and Professor of the Medical Faculty, University of Colombo, and National Coordinator, Health Systems Research, Ministry of Health
 Sanath Lamabathusooriya  – former Dean of the Medical Faculty, University of Colombo and Emeritus Professor of Paediatrics (note: also listed in Medicine)
 Vidya Jyothi Janaka de Silva – Professor Emeritus of Medicine and former Dean, Faculty of Medicine, University of Kelaniya, and former Director, Postgraduate Institute of Medicine, University of Colombo (note: also listed in Medicine)
 Vidya Jyothi A. W. Mailvaganam – former Dean of Faculty of Science, University of Ceylon
 S. Mahalingam – former Dean of the Faculty of Veterinary Sciences, University of Peradeniya and Professor of Veterinary Clinical Sciences
 Ajith P. Madurapperuma – Former Dean and Senior Lecturer, Faculty of Information Technology, University of Moratuwa
 Sunitha Wickramasinghe  – Deputy Dean of the Imperial College School of Medicine and Professor of Haematology
 David de Kretser  – former Associate Dean of the Faculty of Medicine, Nursing and Health Sciences, Monash University (note: also listed in Viceregal)

 Michael Dias Bandaranaike  – Professor of Jurisprudence, University of Cambridge; Director of Studies and Fellow of Magdalene College, Cambridge
 Vidya Jyothi Chandra Wickramasinghe FIMA FRAS FRSA – Professor of Applied Mathematics and Astronomy at Cardiff University and Director of the Cardiff Centre for Astrobiology
 K. N. Seneviratne – Professor of Medicine and founder director of Sri Lanka's Postgraduate Institute of Medicine
 Muhammad Ajward Macan Markar  – first Professor of Medicine, University of Ceylon, Peradeniya
 Saman Kelegama – Executive Director, Institute of Policy Studies of Sri Lanka and former President of the Sri Lanka Economic Association
 K. N. Jayatilleke – Head of the Department of Philosophy at the University of Ceylon and Professor of Philosophy
 Kollupitiye Mahinda Sangharakkhitha Thera – Professor and Head of the Buddhist and Pail Faculty of the University of Kelaniya (note: also listed in Prelates)
 Rohan Abeyaratne – Quentin Berg Professor of Mechanics and CEO/Director of the SMART Centre, Massachusetts Institute of Technology
 Nalin Kulatilaka – Wing Tat Lee Family Professor of Management and Research Director of Institute for Leading in a Dynamic Economy, Boston University
 Gihan Wikramanayake – Professor of Computer Science and Director, University of Colombo School of Computing
 Janek Ratnatunga – former Head of the School of Commerce, University of South Australia and Professor of Accounting
 Vidya Jyothi Rezvi Sheriff – Senior Professor of Medicine, Director of the Post Graduate Institute of Medicine, University of Colombo
 Kumaraswamy "Vela" Velupillai – Professor of Economics, Department of Economics, University of Trento
 Milroy Paul MRCP  – first Professor of Surgery, Ceylon Medical College and co-founder International College of Surgeons
 Lakshman Marasinghe – Emeritus Professor of Law, University of Windsor (note: also listed in Public commissions and corporations)
 Saman Gunatilake  FCCP – Professor of Medicine, University of Sri Jayewardenepura (note: also listed in Medicine)
 Nalin de Silva – Professor of Mathematics, Department of Mathematics, University of Kelaniya
 A. Suri Ratnapala – Professor of Law, T.C. Beirne School of Law, University of Queensland
 Nihal Jayawickrama – former Professor of Law at University of Hong Kong and Ariel F Sallows Professor of Human Rights at University of Saskatchewan (note: also listed in lawyers)
 Chandima Gomes – Professor of Electrical Engineering, Universiti Putra Malaysia and Head of the Centre for Electromagnetic and Lightning Protection Malaysia
 R. K. W. Goonesekera – Professor of Law, Ahmadu Bello University
 Asantha Cooray – Associate Professor, Department of Physics and Astronomy, University of California, Irvine and a leading researcher in the field of Cosmology and theoretical astrophysics
 Brendon Gooneratne – Head and Senior Lecturer, Department of Parasitology, University of Ceylon, Peradeniya (note: also listed in Authors)
 Murugesapillai Maheswaran – Professor Emeritus of Mathematics, University of Wisconsin Stevens Point at Wausau, formerly Professor and Head, Department of Mathematics, University of Peradeniya.

Scientists

Educationalists

Public commissions and corporations

Industrialists and corporate executives

Sports

Sports administrators

Sports

Engineers

Legal

Architects

Medicine

Media

Aviation

Arts

Activists

Religion

Old Royalists in fiction
Many fictional characters have been described as Old Royalists. These include:
 Carlaboy von Bloss from the novel Once Upon a Tender Time
 Allan from the novel (later made into a film) Kaliyugaya
 Malin from the novel (later made into a film) Yuganthaya
 Mithra Dias from the novel The Giniralla Conspiracy
 The revolutionary Kumudu Prasanna from the novel The Giniralla Conspiracy
 Janendra "Janu" Samarawickrama from the novel There is Something I Have to Tell You

References

 
Royal College
Royal College, Colombo